Garlett is a surname. Notable people with the surname include:

Cruize Garlett (born 1989), Australian rules footballer
Jarrod Garlett (born 1996), Australian rules footballer, second cousin of Jeff
Jeff Garlett (born 1989), Australian rules footballer

See also
Garnett (surname)